The Aho Group Report on Creating an Innovative Europe was published in 2006. The report was written by a four-member group chaired by Esko Aho, former Finnish Prime Minister. The committee was created at the Hampton Court summit in the United Kingdom (UK) in October 2005. The report focuses on the creation of innovation friendly markets, strengthening of R&D resources, increasing the structural mobility in Europe and to foster a culture which celebrates innovation.

Members
 Mr. Esko Aho (Chairman) – Former Prime Minister of Finland
 Dr. Jozef Cornu – former President and COO of Alcatel Telecom
 Prof. Luke Georghiou (Rapporteur) – Manchester Business School of the University of Manchester
 Prof. Antoni Subirà – IESE Business School (Barcelona)

Summary
The report states that current trends in the European Union are unsustainable in the face of global competition and calls for a European pact for research and innovation. The report urges for rapid, collective action on a European scale and a new vision to address Europe’s productivity and social challenges.

The creation of an internal market for innovative products and services, in a harmonised regulatory environment, would provide incentives to companies to increase their investments in research and development on a broader range of modern technologies. The strategic areas for the European economy are eHealth, pharmaceuticals, transport and logistics, energy, security, the environment and the digital content industry. The report puts forward improved financing of science and to increase investments and to provide fiscal incentives in high-tech domains such as biotechnology, nanotechnology and neurosciences. The report also makes a plea for the mobility of the European workforce, ideas and financial assets.

See also
 Directorate-General for Enterprise and Industry (EU)
 Lisbon Strategy
 Sapir Report

References

 Rapid reaction required right away
 Aho report: Final call for concrete efforts on research and innovation
 Aho Group Report

External links
 Aho Group Report on "Creating an Innovative Europe"

History of the European Union
2006 in the European Union
Government reports
2005 works